Xiao Aihua (born 16 March 1971) is a Chinese fencer. She competed in the women's foil events at the 1988, 1992, 1996 and 2000 Summer Olympics.

References

1971 births
Living people
Chinese female fencers
Olympic fencers of China
Fencers at the 1988 Summer Olympics
Fencers at the 1992 Summer Olympics
Fencers at the 1996 Summer Olympics
Fencers at the 2000 Summer Olympics
Fencers from Jiangsu
Asian Games medalists in fencing
Fencers at the 1990 Asian Games
Fencers at the 1994 Asian Games
Fencers at the 1998 Asian Games
Asian Games gold medalists for China
Asian Games silver medalists for China
Medalists at the 1990 Asian Games
Medalists at the 1994 Asian Games
Medalists at the 1998 Asian Games
Universiade medalists in fencing
Universiade silver medalists for China
Medalists at the 1991 Summer Universiade
Medalists at the 1993 Summer Universiade
Medalists at the 1997 Summer Universiade
Medalists at the 1999 Summer Universiade
20th-century Chinese women